C. E. Barham (September 28, 1904 – February 23, 1972), nicknamed "Juicy" and "Cap", was an American politician. He served as a Democratic member of the Louisiana State Senate.

Life and career 
Barham attended Northwestern State University and Louisiana State University.

In 1948, Barham was elected to the Louisiana State Senate, serving until 1952, when he elected to the Louisiana lieutenant governorship, serving under Governor Robert F. Kennon. He served until 1956, when he was succeeded by Lether Edward Frazar.

Barham died in February 1972, at the age of 67.

References 

1904 births
1972 deaths
Lieutenant Governors of Louisiana
Democratic Party Louisiana state senators
20th-century American politicians
Louisiana State University alumni
Northwestern State University alumni